Ras Mkumbuu Ruins (Magofu ya mji wa kale wa Ras Mkumbuu in Swahili ) are located in Chake Chake district of South Pemba Region. They lie close to the village of Ndagoni at the end of a long narrow peninsula known as Ras Mkumbuu, which lies to the northwest of the town of Chake-Chake.
The ruins mainly date from the 9th century CE and were abandoned in the 16th century, though there are indications that they were built over older foundations. Notable among these ruins are those of a large mosque which was for some time the largest structure of its type in sub-Saharan Africa.
James Kirkman, the first archeologist to excavate here in the 1950s, proposed to connect his findings with the "Qanbalu" mentioned by the Arab explorer Al-Masudi around 900 but could not identify remnants earlier than the 13th century
. A possible identification of Pemba Island as a whole and especially Ras Mkumbuu with Qanbalu is still discussed.

See also
 Historic Swahili Settlements

References

Finke, J. (2006) The Rough Guide to Zanzibar (2nd edition). New York: Rough Guides.

Pemba Island
Archaeological sites in Tanzania
Former populated places in Tanzania